The Ibanag language (also Ybanag or Ibanak) is an Austronesian language spoken by up to 500,000 speakers, most particularly by the Ibanag people, in the Philippines, in the northeastern provinces of Isabela and Cagayan, especially in Tuguegarao, Solana, Abulug, Cabagan, and Ilagan and with overseas immigrants in countries located in the Middle East, United Kingdom and the United States. Most of the speakers can also speak Ilocano, the lingua franca of northern Luzon island. It is closely related to Gaddang, Itawis, Agta, Atta, Yogad, Isneg, and Malaweg.

Classification
Similar to more known languages in the Philippines such as Cebuano and Tagalog, Ibanag is a Philippine language within the Austronesian language family. On the other hand, it belongs to the Northern Philippine languages subgroup where related yet larger Ilokano and Pangasinan also fall under.

Distribution and dialects
Ibanag is spoken in various areas of Northeastern Region of the Philippines (namely within Isabela and Cagayan), and because of this there are also minor differences in the way that it is spoken in these areas. Ibanag spoken in Tuguegarao is known to be the standard dialect. And other native Ibanag speakers usually distinguish if the speaker is from Tuguegarao City with the variation of their pronunciation and accent. Most who have adapted the urban dialects of Ibanag tend to have a Hispanic accent.

In Tuguegarao, before the Spaniards came, the language was Irraya (an almost-extinct Gaddang dialect). Spaniards introduced Ibanag to the city from Lal-lo (formerly the city of Nueva Segovia) and made the language as the lingua franca of the northeastern Philippines. But with the introduction of Ilocano settlers, Ilocano has become the new lingua franca since the late 20th century.

Cauayan speakers and Ilagan speakers in Isabela have a hard accent as opposed to the Tuguegarao Ibanag that sounded Hispanic. But, native speakers of Northern Cagayan have a harder accent.

For example, Ibanags from towns in northern Cagayan, which includes Abulug, Aparri, Camalaniugan, Pamplona and Lallo, tend to replace their ps with fs. Also, certain Ibanag words differ from these areas as opposed to the Tuguegarao and Isabela Ibanag. The dialects are South Ibanag and North Ibanag.

Examples:
 –  ('hot')
 –  ('a place to put')
 –  ('banana')

Tuguegarao Ibanag may be considered the standard; however, Northern Cagayan Ibanag may be closest to the ancient Pre-Hispanic Ibanag existent prior to the spread of the language throughout the province, as Northern Cagayan was the original Ibanag home territory. On the other hand, Tuguegarao Ibanag, besides having Spanish influences, may have acquired elements from nearby Itawis. At the same time, Isabela Ibanag may have acquired elements from the original Gaddang language predominant in the province.

Archaic Ibanag
Also, the Ibanag term for the number one, was once used interchangeably with the word , which is no longer used apparently by modern speakers of the language.

Use and current status 
As of Oct. 2012, "revival of the Ibanag culture is part of the Mother-Tongue Based (MTB) program of the [Philippine] government which seeks to preserve indigenous cultures, including its languages, for generations to come.  Ibanag is one of the MTB languages now taught in Philippine schools," and two current stage plays,  (Heritage of the River) and Why Women Wash the Dishes are being performed in the Ibanag language.

Phonology

Vowels

Monophthongization of diphthongs is observable in Ibanag.

Consonants
Ibanag is one of the Philippine languages which are excluded in the - allophony.

Ibanag features gemination:
   ('half')
   ('to squeeze, squeezing')

Orthography
There are two ways that Ibanag can be written. In older texts, the "Spanish style" is often used: ⟨c⟩, and ⟨qu⟩ are used to represent /k/, and words that end with a glottal stop have -c added to the end of the word.

Example: . 'We ate pork.'

Example:  'The sky is full of clouds.'

The other way of writing Ibanag is the new, simplified way which tends to be more phonetic. This modern spelling system is consistent with that of the Filipino language and other languages such as Bisaya and Ilokano. Moreover, silent letters are omitted. This orthography is the one being adopted for use in public schools for the purpose of the Department of Education's Mother Tongue-Based Multilingual Education policy in Ibanag-speaking areas and is prescribed by the Ibanag Heritage Foundation, Inc.

Example:  'We ate pork.'

Example:  'The sky is full of clouds.'

Grammar

Nouns

Personal pronouns

Independent pronouns
I:  (Isabela), 
You:  (Isabela)
He, she, it: 
We (inclusive):  (Isabela)
We (exclusive): 
You (plural/polite): 
They:

Sakan/So'
I/me: There are many ways to say I or me in Ibanag. The language is agglutinative. Thus most of the time pronouns are attached to verbs. There are at least four ways to indicate the pronoun I.
'I gave him some food':  =  ('to give')  ('I').
'I will be the one to go':  =  ('I')
'I split it in half':  =  ('to split in half') ' ('I'). Here the glottal stop on the sentence indicates 'I'. Without the glottal stop, the sentence would become incomplete and would otherwise not make any sense.

Sikaw
You: There are also a couple of ways to indicate you.

Yayya
He/she/it: As with the other pronouns, there are a couple of ways to say this, but usually people use .
'He lost it':  'lost' 'he/she/it' (NOTE: without the glottal stop,  can mean 'he', 'she', or 'it'.)

Sittam
'Let's go':  (Isabela) or

Sikami
We: To exclude the person being spoken to,  is used. In this case,  is attached to the end of the verb, adjective or noun.
'We are going to look':  =  ('to go'),  ('we')
'We are full' (as in food):  =  ('full'),  (exclusive 'we')
'We are Ibanags':

Sikamu
You: This is for plural 'you'.
'Go get him/her':  =  ('to get'),  (plural 'you')
'You went there?':  =  ('went')  ('you')

Ira
They: .  is seldom used unless emphasizing that it is 'them'.
'They bought my house':  =  ('bought'),  ('they')

Possessive pronouns

 is the root word that identifies something as belonging to someone. Often  is added before  to emphasize this. This is only possible with 'mine' and 'yours' but not with other possessive pronouns.

'That IS mine.': 

'Me': 
'Your, yours': -m, 
'His, her, its': , 
'Our, ours' (inclusive): , 
'Our, ours' (exclusive): , 
'Your, yours': , 
'Their, theirs': , 
'My toy': 
'Your gift': 
'Her earring': 
'Our land': 
'Our house': 
'Your car': 
'Their dog': 
'This is mine': 
'This is hers/his': 
'That is yours': 
'That is hers':

Demonstrative pronouns

'That' (far from both speaker and person being spoken to):  or 
'That' (sometimes used for objects that are absent or in the past): 
'This dog': 
'That cat': 
'That carabao': 
'That day': 

In order to emphasize or stress the distance or time, the stress on the word falls on the first syllable except for  – i.e.  'that land'.

Other ways that words are emphasized are by using locatives.
'THIS house' (here): 
'That girl there': 
'That man over there': 
'That old lady a long time ago': *

With  the stress on tu is often lengthened to emphasize the distance and time that has passed.

Locatives

'Here':  or 
'There':  (by person being spoken to)
'There':  (far from both)
'There':  (absent, past time and/or location)

Enclitic particles

Interrogative Words
'What?': 
'When?': 
'Where?': 
'Who?': 
'Why?': 
'How?': 
'How much?': 

Each of the doubled consonants must be pronounced separately – i.e.  – an ni

'What are you doing?': 
'When did you arrive?': 
'Where are we going?': 
'Who took my fan?': 
'Why are you not eating?': 
'How are you going to cook that if you don't have the ingredients?': 
'How much is this? How much is that?':

Verbs
Ibanag verbs are conjugated based on tense, but not person.

Like most other Malayo-Polynesian languages, Ibanag does not have a copula, which means there is no verb equivalent to English to be. However, this is sometimes compensated for by using the verb for to have.

Infinitive and present tense
Many times, the infinitive form is the same as the present tense.

'There is'/'to have': 
'To eat/eat': 
'To drink/drink': 
'To need/need': 
'To want/want', 'to like/like': 
'To go/go', 'to come/come': 
'To not want/not want', 'to not like/not like': 
'I am here': 
'Do you eat goat?': 
'Drink this': 
'Drink water': 
'You need to sleep': 
'To ask':

Past tense
There are different ways to form the past tense. Here are a few common ways.

'Cooked': 
'Cut': 
'Cut (hair)': 
'Placed far away': 
'Bought': 
'We cooked dinengdeng': 
'We cooked the pig':  ( becomes  assuming the pig itself is not present since it was already cooked)
'They cut my hair': 
'I got my hair cut': 
'They placed him far away': 
'I bought you this cow':

Future tense
Again, there are a couple of ways of forming future tense. One is by the use of a helping word like to go.Sometimes the present tense can indicate future depending on the context.

'We are going to pick him up.': 

Sangaw and Sangawe

'Do it now':  ( not used in Tuguegarao)
'Do it now':  (Isabela)
'Later on': ,

Structure

Syntax and word order

Ibanag sentence structure often follows the verb–subject–object pattern.

'Andoy took out the dog.': 

Adjectives often follow the nouns with a marker attached.

'Big house': 

Simple sentences as opposed to descriptive patterns:

'The house is red': 

'The red house':

Markers

They either link adjectives to nouns or indicate the subject of the sentence.

'Loud laughter': .  indicates 'loud' and the  links it to laughter.
'Your child is tall.': . With the lack of the verb to be and a switched syntax,  indicates that your child is the subject.

 is another marker that is used, but is not very simple to explain. Often it is seen in conjunction with the word , meaning 'nothing, none'.

'There is nothing to eat.':  – Tagalog: .

 is yet another marker used.  is like  in Tagalog.

 is used to refer to place (Isabela). This is also used in Tuguegarao.
               
Example: 'We went to Tuguegarao.': 
   
 is used to refer to things.
               
Example: 'We ate pork.'  (Isabela)

Consonant mutation

Ibanag verbs that end in n lose the last consonant, which is replaced by the first consonant of the succeeding word. However, when the succeeding word starts with a vowel or another n, the last n is not affected.

Examples:

 *

Correct:  'Go get the book.'

 *

Correct:  'I saw his father.'

The marker  and the preposition  (not the pronoun) sometimes, depending also on the dialect, acquire the first consonant of the succeeding word.

 'at the back of the house'

 'on top.'

Samples

Proverbs
This is an example of an Ibanag proverb, which is also known throughout the archipelago.

Ibanag:  (*Isabela)

Tagalog: 

English: 'He who does not look back into his past, cannot reach his destination.'

Ibanag: 

Tagalog: 

English: 'In heaven there is no beer, that's why we drink it here.'

Ibanag:  (Tuguegarao)

Ibanag:  (Isabela)

Tagalog: 

English: 'Never call an egg a chick, so that it will not become rotten.'

Cagayan provincial anthem

The direct translation here is different from the English version of the Cagayan Provincial Anthem.

Vocabulary

Loan words
Many words in Ibanag are of Spanish origin. The language is infused with Spanish words that are often not seen or heard in any of the other Philippine languages.
Eyeglasses: /
Plants: 
Store:  (from )
Door: 
Toilet: 
Quickly, immediately:  (from )

Simple greetings
Good morning:  (others say )
Good afternoon:  (others say )
Good evening/night:  (others say )
How are you?: 
I'm fine/good, and you?: 
I'm just fine, thank God: 
Thank you: 
Where are you going?: 
I'm going to...: 
What are you doing?: 
Nothing in particular: 
Long time no see:

Numbers

Sentences

References

Further reading
 
Moses Esteban. Editing Ibanag–Tagalog–English Ibanag–Tagalog–English Survey. Ibanag people's of Benguet and the City Hall of Benguet (Ifugao)

Salgado, Pedro V. (2002). Cagayan valley and eastern Cordillera, 1581-1898, Volume 1. Quezon City: Rex Commercial.

Languages of Cagayan
Languages of Isabela (province)
Cagayan Valley languages